Carboxypeptidase M (CPM) is an enzyme. This enzyme catalyses the following chemical reaction

 Cleavage of C-terminal arginine or lysine residues from polypeptides

This is a membrane-bound enzyme optimally active at neutral pH.

References

External links 
 

EC 3.4.17